Egedal is a station on the Frederikssund radial of the S-train network in Copenhagen, Denmark. In 2011 it changed name from Gl. Toftegård Station to Egedal station.

Services

See also
 List of railway stations in Denmark

S-train (Copenhagen) stations
Railway stations opened in 2002
2002 establishments in Denmark
Railway stations in Denmark opened in the 21st century